The 36th Street station is a local station on the IND Queens Boulevard Line of the New York City Subway. Located at the intersection of 36th Street and Northern Boulevard in Queens,  it is served by the M train on weekdays, the R train at all times except nights, and the E and F trains at night. The <F> train skips this station when it operates.

History 
The Queens Boulevard Line was one of the first lines built by the city-owned Independent Subway System (IND), and stretches between the IND Eighth Avenue Line in Manhattan and 179th Street and Hillside Avenue in Jamaica, Queens. The Queens Boulevard Line was in part financed by a Public Works Administration (PWA) loan and grant of $25 million. One of the proposed stations would have been located at 36th Street.

Station layout 

This underground station has four tracks and two side platforms. The two center express tracks are used by the E and F trains during daytime hours.

Both platforms have Royal purple I-beam columns at regular intervals with every other one having the standard black station sign plate with white lettering. The station's trim line is Grape with a black border and name tablets have "36TH ST." in white lettering on a black background and Grape border. Small directional and name signs are tiled in white lettering on a black background under the trim line and name tablets.

This is one of two stations on the R route that is named "36th Street"; the other is 36th Street on the BMT Fourth Avenue Line in Brooklyn.

Exits

Each platform has two fare control areas and there are no crossovers or crossunders to allow free transfer between directions. The fare control areas on the Manhattan-bound side are on platform level. The full-time one is at the middle and has a turnstile bank, token booth, and two staircases going up to the three-way intersection of Northern Boulevard, 36th Street, and 35th Street, one to the northeast corner and the other to the island formed by these three streets. The Manhattan-bound platform has another un-staffed entrance/exit at the extreme east (railroad north) end. It has two High Entry/Exit Turnstiles and a single staircase going up to the northeast corner of 36th Street and Northern Boulevard. Connecting these two fare control areas is a passageway that was formerly part of the platform as only a full-height fence separates them and it has the platform's trim line and name tablets.

The fare control areas on the Forest Hills-bound side are un-staffed and on small mezzanines above the platforms that are connected to each other. One is at the extreme west (railroad south) end and has one staircase to the platform, two HEET turnstiles, a part-time bank of regular turnstiles, and one street stair going up to the south side of Northern Boulevard east of 34th Street. The other fare control area has one staircase to the platform, one HEET turnstile and one exit-only turnstile, and one street stair going up to the south side of Northern Boulevard between 36th and 37th Streets.

Nearby track infrastructure

There are route selector punch boxes on the southbound platform, for the connection to IND 63rd Street Line (currently used by the F train from the express tracks) west of the station. In normal revenue service, all trains that stop at this station continue along the IND Queens Boulevard Line to Queens Plaza.

East of this station, the express tracks dive down to a lower level and make a direct route to Roosevelt Avenue along Northern Boulevard while the local tracks turn north into Steinway Street and then east under Broadway. This is because Broadway and Steinway Street are not wide enough to hold four tracks underneath them. The only other line in the system where the express tracks split away from the mainline and make a shortcut is on the IND Culver Line between Seventh Avenue and Church Avenue in Brooklyn.

References

External links 

 
 Station Reporter — R Train
 Station Reporter — M Train
 The Subway Nut — 36th Street Pictures 
 36th Street entrance from Google Maps Street View
 35th Street entrance from Google Maps Street View
 34th Street entrance from Google Maps Street View
 Platforms from Google Maps Street View

IND Queens Boulevard Line stations
1933 establishments in New York City
New York City Subway stations in Queens, New York
Railway stations in the United States opened in 1933
Long Island City